Bean-to-bar is a trade model that was born from the artisan and craft chocolate movement representative of an individual company buying ethically sourced cocoa beans to make high-quality integral chocolate. The term refers to the upper portion of the cacao to chocolate supply chain, it is a legal labelling concept for many chocolate brands and is clearly defined as the consistent manufacturing process of taking whole cocoa beans to make chocolate bars that are ready to eat. Bean-to-bar chocolate manufacturers control the roasting time, sugar content, fat content, additives, flavor ingredients, texture and can even enrich the flavor sensory experience through adding essential oils to create hundreds of flavors, types and classes of chocolate through their businesses. Bean-to-bar is a term that has become synonymous with craft, fine, high-quality, natural and nutritional chocolate.

Introduction to bean-to-bar 
The term "bean-to-bar" emerged from the artisan and craft chocolate movement around 2010. Several hundred small chocolate manufacturing companies were started to meet the demand for bean-to-bar products and a wider variety of flavors emerging from new consumer requirements. Bean-to-bar manufacturers take great care in selecting their cacao beans with many traveling to plantations in tropical regions to meet with growers in order to establish direct-trade relationships, some have managed to gain access to control the fermentation process. Over 2,500 bean-to-bar manufacturers have emerged around the world in less than 20 years. Entrepreneurs from  Australia, Canada, Europe, the United Kingdom and the United States with aptitudes for culinary arts, science, technology have all proven to be successful as chocolate makers, one of the most successful was a lawyer named Askinoise.

All bean-to-bar chocolate makers process whole cocoa beans into a final product versus melting chocolate or starting with ground cocoa mass for use as a base, coating, filling or for mixing and molding into truffles, pralines, or other chocolate confectionery. One of the largest startups, the Mast Brothers, that was "widely credited for introducing artisanal chocolate to mainstream American culture" actually employed commercially produced chocolate from a third-party, making them better known as the creators of fake bean-to-bar chocolate in 2015. Big Chocolate has also been using the term to compete with the craft chocolate industry developed around the bean-to-bar concept.

As a result of the rise in consumer demand for fine and aromatic dark chocolate created by bean-to-bar (craft chocolate movement) and the idea of small batch recipes, new types of processing equipment and machinery have been developed facilitating small business development. Bean-to-bar chocolate makers are revolutionizing the world of chocolate leading to the development of many new legal marketing terms to better describe their products to match consumer demand and expectations. Schools and universities have developed classes and courses in bean-to-bar chocolate making and business development. New certifications, endorsements and labelling schemes based on ethical consumer values have also appeared. Big Chocolate has outright acquired several craft bean-to-bar operations.

Innovation of the supply chain 
Some bean-to-bar producers are large companies that own the entire process for economic reasons; others aim to control the whole process to improve quality, working conditions, environmental impact, and the source. Since the industry began developing — new certification schemes have been created, trade shows are held annually, the idea has become a centerpiece concept at chocolate tasting competitions and organizations have been developed.  Some cacao farms in tropical America have incorporated the trade model to add-value to make the supply chain more sustainable by producing "tree-to-bar" and "farm-to-bar" chocolate.

Certification companies are hired by the buyers and growers of fine cacao to inspect plantations, take soil samples, guarantee pricing to farmers and even develop regional cooperative associations for cocoa growers. Bean-to-bar chocolate makers are paying more conscientiously for these certified labels to address issues important to their consumers to be able to convey direct-trade, fair-trade, organic, single-origin, and wild-grown.

Legal, marketing and technical term 
Unlike the large scale secondary processing from general chocolate liquor mass, the bean-to-bar chocolate manufacturing style must follow the guideline that the primary company handles the entire process from the purchase of cacao beans (Bean) to the making of the chocolate bar (Bar). Technically, the term is also a legal statement to consumers which is not limited to small craft chocolate manufacturers, because of the market competition and the consumer's demand for bean-to-bar brands, big chocolate (the corporate giants) have adopted the term and some of the other related terms used by smaller chocolate makers.  Values like transparency, sustainability, cooperation and ethics have all proved to be rewarding for most small companies that have emerged since 2010 have sales from $250,000 to 10 million annually.

It is believed the industry was started in the late 90's, in San Francisco, where two men — John Scharffenberger and Robert Steinberg — spent a decade beginning a movement while building their business, and then spreading that movement by selling their business. The predominant theory of the start of the craft chocolate industry is that a boom occurred around the Mast Brothers, who entered the chocolate making industry after Scharffenberger from different industries in New York around 2008. By 2014 in Japan, the brand "Minimal", was introduced as a pioneer for the inspiration of bean-to-bar makers there, its taste has been recognized at international competitions.

Many bean-to-bar chocolate makers are based solely online, some have stores for their product, some use other retail locations to sell their product, some contract their facilities and some even private label chocolates for other companies.

References 

Chocolate
Types of chocolate